Mass suicide is a form of suicide, occurring when a group of people simultaneously kill themselves.

Overview 
Mass suicide sometimes occurs in religious settings. In war, defeated groups may resort to mass suicide rather than being captured. Suicide pacts are a form of mass suicide that are sometimes planned or carried out by small groups of depressed or hopeless people. Mass suicides have been used as a form of political protest.

Attitudes towards mass suicide change according to place and circumstance. People who resort to mass suicide rather than submit to what they consider intolerable oppression sometimes become the focus of a heroic myth. Such mass suicides might also win the grudging respect of the victors. On the other hand, the act of people resorting to mass suicide without being threatened – especially, when driven to this step by a charismatic religious leader, for reasons which often seem obscure – tends to be regarded far more negatively.

Historical mass suicides 

 Following the destruction of the Iberian city of Illiturgis by Roman General Publius Cornelius Scipio in 206 BC, people of Astapa – knowing they faced a similar fate – decided to burn the city with all of its treasures and then kill themselves.
 During the late 2nd century BC, the Teutons are recorded as marching south through Gaul along with their neighbors, the Cimbri, and attacking Roman Italy. After several victories for the invading armies, the Cimbri and Teutones were then defeated by Gaius Marius in 102 BC at the Battle of Aquae Sextiae (near present-day Aix-en-Provence). Their King, Teutobod, was taken in irons. The captured women killed themselves, which passed into Roman legends of Germanic heroism: by the conditions of the surrender three hundred of their married women were to be handed over to the Romans. When the Teuton matrons heard of this stipulation, they first begged the consul that they might be set apart to minister in the temples of Ceres and Venus; then, when they failed to obtain their request and were removed by the lictors, they slew their children and next morning were all found dead in each other's arms having strangled themselves in the night.
 At the end of the fifteen months of the siege of Numantia in summer 133 BC many of the defeated Numantines, instead of surrendering to the Romans, preferred to kill themselves and set fire to the city.
 The 960 members of the Sicarii Jewish community at Masada collectively killed themselves in 73 AD rather than be conquered and enslaved by the Romans. Each man killed his wife and children, then the men drew lots and killed each other until the last man killed himself. Some modern scholars have questioned this account of the events.
 In the 700s, the remnants of the Montanists were ordered by Byzantine Emperor Leo III to leave their religion and join Orthodox Christianity. They refused, locked themselves in their places of worship, and set them on fire.
 In India, the mass suicide, also known as Jauhar, was carried out by women and men of the defeated community, when the fall of a city besieged by the enemy forces was certain. Some of the known cases of Jauhar of Rajput women are at the fort of Chittaur in Rajasthan, in 1303, in 1535, and 1568.
 In 1336, when the castle of Pilėnai in the Grand Duchy of Lithuania was besieged by the army of the Teutonic Knights, the defenders, led by the Duke Margiris, realized that it was impossible to defend themselves any longer and made the decision to kill themselves, as well as to set the castle on fire in order to destroy all of their possessions, and anything of value to the enemy.
 During the Great Schism of the Russian Church, entire villages of Old Believers burned themselves to death in an act known as "fire baptism".
 In 1792, Revolutionary France abolished slavery in its Caribbean colonies. However, in 1802 Napoleon decided to restore slavery. In Guadeloupe, former slaves who refused to be re-enslaved started a rebellion, led by Louis Delgrès, and for some time resisted the French Army sent to suppress them – but finally realized that they could not win, and still they refused to surrender. At the Battle of Matouba on 28 May 1802, Delgrès and his followers – 400 men and some women – ignited their gunpowder stores, killing themselves while attempting to kill as many of the French troops as possible.
 During the Turkish rule of Greece and shortly before the Greek War of Independence, women from Souli, pursued by the Ottomans, ascended the mount Zalongo, threw their children over the precipice and then jumped themselves, to avoid capture – an event known as the Dance of Zalongo.
 In the final phase of the Warsaw Ghetto Uprising, many of the fighters besieged in the "bunker" at Miła 18 killed themselves by ingesting poison rather than surrender to the Nazis.
 Germany was stricken by a series of unprecedented waves of suicides during the final days of the Nazi regime. The reasons for these waves of suicides were numerous and include the effects of Nazi propaganda, the example of the suicide of Adolf Hitler, victims' attachment to the ideals of the Nazi Party, a reaction to the loss of the war and, consequently, the anticipated Allied occupation of Nazi Germany. Life Magazine speculated about the suicides: "In the last days of the war the overwhelming realization of utter defeat was too much for many Germans. Stripped of the bayonets and bombast which had given them power, they could not face a reckoning with either their conquerors or their consciences. These found the quickest and surest escape in what Germans call selbstmord, self-murder."
 On 1 May 1945, about 1,000 residents of Demmin, Germany, stoked with hysteria fueled by Nazi propaganda, committed mass suicide in the advent of the Red Army's liberation of the town.
 A Balinese mass ritual suicide is called a puputan. Major puputan occurred in 1906–1908 when Balinese kingdoms faced overwhelming Dutch colonial forces. The root of the Balinese term puputan is puput, meaning 'finishing' or 'ending'. It is an act that is more symbolic than strategic; the Balinese are "a people whose genius for theatre is unsurpassed" and a puputan is viewed as "the last act of a tragic dance-drama".
 Japan is known for its centuries of suicide tradition, from seppuku ceremonial self-disemboweling to kamikaze warriors flying their aircraft into Allied warships and banzai charge during World War II. During this same war, the Japanese forces announced to the people of Saipan that the invading American troops were going to torture and murder anyone on the island. In a desperate effort to avoid this, the people of Saipan committed suicide, many jumping from places later named "Suicide Cliff" and "Banzai Cliff". Similar cases of mass suicide by Japanese civilians and colonial settlers also happened during the subsequent Battle of Okinawa and the Soviet invasion of Manchuria.

Religiously motivated suicides

Known mass suicides

Bekeranta (1840s)
In the 19th century British Guiana, Awakaipu, an Arekuna shaman, established a settlement of indigenous tribesmen called Bekeranta (Berbice Creole Dutch, meaning "Land of the White People") at the base of Kukenán-tepui. In approximately 1843 or 1844, Awakaipu instructed his followers to violently murder each other in order to reincarnate themselves as white people. Unofficial figures put the death toll at around 400, which included men, women, and children.

Yogmaya's Jal Samadhi (1941)
Yogmaya Neupane and her group of 67 disciples committed the biggest mass suicide (Jal-Samadhi) in Nepali history, by jumping into the Arun River (China–Nepal) in 1941.

Peoples Temple (1978)

On November 18, 1978, 918 Americans, including 276 children, died in Peoples Temple–related incidents, including 909 members of the Temple, led by Jim Jones, in Jonestown, Guyana.  A tape of the Temple's final meeting in a Jonestown pavilion contains repeated discussions of the group committing "revolutionary suicide", including reference to people taking the poison and the vats to be used.

On that tape, Jones tells Temple members that the Soviet Union, with whom the Temple had been negotiating a potential exodus for months, would not take them after the Temple had murdered Member of Congress Leo Ryan, NBC reporter Don Harris and three others at a nearby airstrip. When members apparently cried, Jones counseled "Stop this hysterics. This is not the way for people who are Socialists or Communists to die. No way for us to die. We must die with some dignity." At the end of the tape, Jones concludes: "We didn't commit suicide, we committed an act of revolutionary suicide protesting the conditions of an inhumane world."

The people in Jonestown died of an apparent cyanide poisoning, except for Jones (who died of an injury consistent with a self-inflicted gunshot wound) and his personal nurse. The Temple had spoken of committing "revolutionary suicide" in prior instances, and members had previously drunk what Jones told them was poison at least once before, but the "Flavor Aid" drink they ingested at that time contained no poison. Concurrently, four other members died in the Temple's headquarters in Georgetown. Four months later, Michael Prokes, one of the initial survivors, also committed suicide.

Solar Temple (1994–1997)

From 1994 to 1997, the Order of the Solar Temple's members began a series of mass suicides, which led to roughly 74 deaths. Farewell letters were left by members, stating that they believed their deaths would be an escape from the "hypocrisies and oppression of this world". Added to this they felt they were "moving on to Sirius". Records seized by the Quebec police showed that some members had personally donated over $1 million to the group's leader, Joseph Di Mambro.

There was also another attempted mass suicide of the remaining members, which was thwarted in the late 1990s. All the suicide/murders and attempts occurred around the dates of the equinoxes and solstices, which likely held some relation to the beliefs of the group.

Heaven's Gate (1997)

From March 24 to 27, 1997, 39 followers of Heaven's Gate died in a mass suicide in Rancho Santa Fe, California, which borders San Diego to the north. These people believed, according to the teachings of their group, that through their suicides they were "exiting their human vessels" so that their souls could go on a journey aboard a spaceship they believed to be following comet Hale–Bopp. Some male members of the group underwent voluntary castration in preparation for the genderless life they believed awaited them after the suicide.

In May 1997, two Heaven's Gate members who had not been present for the mass suicide attempted suicide, one succeeding, the other becoming comatose for two days and then recovering. In February 1998, the survivor, Chuck Humphrey, committed suicide.

Béchard Lane Eckankar (2004)
In August 2004, ten dead bodies were discovered, all in a sleeping position, inside a two-story house located at Béchard Lane in the suburb of Saint Paul, Vacoas-Phoenix on the island of Mauritius. They had been missing for a number of days, and large loans had been contracted by some of the victims a short time before their deaths. Several of them were active members of the Eckankar sect. The main gate and all doors of the house had been locked from the inside, and the interior was in tidy order when police broke into the house.

Adam House (2007)
In 2007, in Mymensingh, Bangladesh, a family of nine, all members of a novel "Adam's cult", committed mass suicide by hurling themselves under a train. Diaries recovered from the victims' home, the "Adam House", related they wanted a pure life as lived by Adam and Eve, freeing themselves from bondage to any religion, and refusing contact with any outsiders. After leaving Islam, they fell out of boundaries of any particular religion.

Burari Deaths (2018)

The Burari deaths, also "Burari case" and "Burari kaand", refers to the deaths of eleven family members of the Chundawat family from Burari, India, in 2018. Ten family members were found hanged, while the oldest family member, the grandmother, was strangled. The bodies were found on 1 July 2018; in the early morning after the death. The police have ruled the deaths as mass suicide, with an angle of shared psychosis being investigated.

Disputed religiously motivated suicides

Movement for the Restoration of the Ten Commandments of God (2000) 

On March 17, 2000, 778 members of the Movement for the Restoration of the Ten Commandments of God died in Uganda. The theory that all of the members died in a mass suicide was changed to mass murder when decomposing bodies were discovered in pits with signs of strangulation, while others had stab wounds. The group had diverged from the Roman Catholic Church in order to emphasize apocalypticism and alleged Marian apparitions. The group had been called an inward-looking movement, that wore matching uniforms, and restricted their speech to avoid saying anything dishonest or sinful. On the suicide itself, locals said they held a party, at which 70 crates of soft drinks and three bulls were consumed. This version of events has been criticized, most notably by Irving Hexham, and a Ugandan source states that even today, "no one can really explain the whys, hows, whats, where, when, etc."

Training centre for release of the Atma-energy

Training centre for release of the Atma-energy was known for a police and media scare, in which an alleged attempt to commit ritual suicide took place in Teide National Park in Tenerife in 1998.

See also
 Cult
 Religious fanaticism
 Khovanshchina
 Puputan
 Folie à deux

References

External links 
 "From Silver Lake to Suicide: One Family's Secret History of the Jonestown Massacre"  by Barry Isaacson
 39 men die in mass suicide near San Diego – CNN, 26 March 1997
 Near-Death Experience Time.com 19 January 1998
 Arunima Dey, "Women as Martyrs: Mass Suicides at Thoas Khalsa During the Partition of India", Indi@logs, Vol 3 2016, pp. 7–17, 
 The Downfall of Jim Jones by Larry Lee Litke. Published at The Jonestown Institute. Originally published 1980